The Thailand twenty-five-satang coin is a currency unit equivalent to one-fourth of a Thai baht. It is commonly called salueng by Thai speakers.

Mintages 
 1987 ~ 5,108,000
 1988 ~ 42,096,000
 1989 ~ 58,940,000
 1990 ~ 81,384,000
 1991 ~ 45,496,380
 1992 ~ 71,311,000
 1993 ~ 236,130,000
 1994 ~ 102,856,000
 1995 ~ 17,000,000
 1996 ~ 185,012,523
 1997 ~ 85,000,000
 1998 ~ 20,000,000
 1999 ~ 10,000
 2000 ~ 200,098,000
 2001 ~ 10,000
 2002 ~ 141,562,000
 2003 ~ 82,668,000
 2004 ~ 104,830,000
 2005 ~ 95,362,000
 2006 ~ 120,003,000
 2007 ~ 180,000,000
 2008 (old series) ~ 255,600
 2008 (new series) ~ 289,995,600
 2009 ~ 220,000,000

References 

Coins of Thailand
Twenty-five-cent coins